Vasily Grigoryevich Yakemenko (born 1971 in Lyubertsy, Moscow Oblast, Soviet Union) is a Russian politician, creator and leader of several pro-government youth groups.

Career
From 1989 to 1991, Yakemenko served in the Soviet Armed Forces. He then studied at the economics department of Moscow State University. In the 1990s he was financial director of various construction companies before joining the presidential administration in 2000.

Youth activities
In May 2000, he founded the movement Walking Together (Idushie vmyestye), which became well known for its struggle against Vladimir Sorokin's books and the band Leningrad. In 2005 he became the leader of Nashi, a new pro-Putin youth movement.

On October 8, 2007, new Prime Minister Viktor Zubkov appointed Yakemenko chairman of the newly created Rosmolodyozh (State Committee for Youth or Federal Youth Agency). An insider at the NTV channel has said that its Director General Vladimir Kulistikov routinely bans negative stories about Yakemenko and Rosmolodyozh.

Mario's incident
In October 2011 socialite, journalist and TV personality, Ksenia Sobchak, spotted Yakemenko at Mario's – one of Moscow's top restaurants. She had a videocamera with her and began asking him for an interview. When he turned her down, Sobchak said: "Look at this restaurant, this menu – Bellini champagne for 1,300 rubles a glass, fresh oysters for 500 rubles each. I mean, it’s not surprising for me to be here, I’m a socialite, but you! It’s everything for the party with you, everything for Nashi." After the encounter, Sobchak posted the video on the internet and it "went viral". Sobchak also pointed out that Yakemenko had said in 2009 that intended to eat less and stay fit: "A person who eats more than he needs robs the country and robs [Vladimir] Putin".

Personal life
Yakemenko is married and has two children.

References

External links
  Пока не загорятся здания

1971 births
Living people
Russian politicians
Russian political activists
People from Lyubertsy
State University of Management alumni